Bilasipara East Assembly constituency is one of the 126 constituencies of the Assam Legislative Assembly in India. Bilasipara East forms a part of the Dhubri Lok Sabha constituency.

Town Details

Following are details on Bilasipara East Assembly constituency-

Country: India.
 State: Assam.
 District: Dhubri district .
 Lok Sabha Constituency: Dhubri Lok Sabha/Parliamentary constituency.
 Assembly Categorisation: Rural
 Literacy Level:  80.47%.
 Eligible Electors as per 2021 General Elections: 2,17,630 Eligible Electors. Male Electors:1,09,571 . Female Electors: 1,08,059.
 Geographic Co-Ordinates: 26°17'29.4"N 90°19'44.0"E.
 Total Area Covered: 493 square kilometres.
 Area Includes: Bilasipara town committee and Bilasipara thana [excluding Sapatgram town committee ard the villages specified in items (9) and (10) of the Appendix] in Dhubri sub-division, of Dhubri district of Assam:.
 Inter State Border : Dhubri.
 Number Of Polling Stations: Year 2011-217,Year 2016-235,Year 2021-27.

Members of Legislative Assembly 

Following is the list of past members representing Bilasipara East Assembly constituency in Assam Legislature.

 1978: Sarat Chandra Sinha, Indian National Congress.
 1983: Rookmini Kanta Roye, Indian National Congress.
 1985: Sarat Chandra Sinha, Indian Congress (Socialist) - Sarat Chandra Sinha.
 1991: Anowar Hussain, Indian National Congress.
 1996: Prasanta Barua, Asom Gana Parishad.
 2001: Prasanta Barua, Asom Gana Parishad.
 2006: Prasanta Barua, Asom Gana Parishad.
 2011: Gul Akhtara Begum, All India United Democratic Front.
 2016: Ashok Kumar Singhi, Bharatiya Janata Party.
 2021:Samsul Huda, All India United Democratic Front.

Election results

2016 result

2011 result

References

External links 
 

Assembly constituencies of Assam